Revolver is a British music TV series on ITV that ran for one series only, of eight episodes, in 1978.

It was produced by ATV. The series producer was Mickie Most, who was inspired to make the programme after he saw an interview with Top of the Pops''' producer Robin Nash, in which he (Nash) boasted that TOTP was a music programme that the whole family could enjoy together. Most set out to make a show which was the antithesis of that, and which featured live music performances most closely related to the then emergent punk rock and new wave music scenes - though it also included other more mainstream artists such as Dire Straits and Lindisfarne as well as more original artists such as Kate Bush.

Peter Cook played the manager of the fictional ballroom where the show was supposedly taking place, and frequently made disparaging remarks about the acts appearing. Chris Hill played the "king of the kids", a loudmouthed character whose role was to stir up the live audience. Birmingham DJ Les Ross ran a hamburger stand while sharing rock trivia and hosting the Revolver Reviver spot. Revolver was recorded in front of a live audience in Birmingham, UK.

Artists featured that subsequently became more famous were: Ian Dury & The Blockheads, The Jam, Elvis Costello and David Coverdale/Whitesnake.

Other notable artists included Alberto Y Lost Trios Paranoias, XTC, Tom Robinson Band, Nick Lowe, Steel Pulse, The Vibrators, The Stranglers, Buzzcocks, Siouxsie and the Banshees, The Rezillos, Bonnie Tyler, The Fabulous Poodles, The Boomtown Rats, The Motors, Suzi Quatro, X-Ray Spex, The Tourists, stunt performer Eddie Kidd performing "Leave it to the Kidd", The Rich Kids, and The Only Ones.Revolver was originally slated as a prime time show, but due to the controversial nature of punk at the time, it was scheduled in a graveyard slot by some ITV regions. It consequently received poor ratings and did not return for a second series.

See alsoOld Grey Whistle TestTop of the PopsSo It Goes (TV series)Alright Now (TV series)The Tube (TV series)Check it Out (UK TV series)''

References

External links

1970s British music television series
1978 British television series debuts
Television shows produced by Associated Television (ATV)
Pop music television series
Rock music television series
1978 British television series endings
English-language television shows
Punk television series